Remain in Memory: The Final Show is a live album by the hardcore punk band Good Riddance, recorded at their final performance May 27, 2007 in their hometown of Santa Cruz, California and released March 18, 2008 through Fat Wreck Chords.

Reception 
Katherine Fulton of Allmusic rated Remain in Memory four stars out of five, saying that "Despite being a live recording, Remain in Memory is remarkably clear — the vocals are articulate and the instruments are vibrant without overwhelming Russ Rankin's impassioned performance, as evidenced on 'Flies First Class'. Throughout the album, Good Riddance is aggressive, at times almost manic, but the overall tone is bright and hopeful even when the band is criticizing politics and society." Ben Conoley of Punknews.org gave it three and a half stars out of five, commenting that the album's length was an impediment to holding listeners' interest: "Remain in Memory captures the whole show, not just highlights, and is not  songs recorded on different nights. This also serves as one of the album's drawbacks, though. At 30 songs, the set is just too long for anyone but a diehard fan to really stay interested in the whole time. It helps that all of their best songs are represented and spread apart enough to pull you back in, but an hour-plus of Good Riddance is simply too much."

Both Fulton and Conoley praised the album's production value, with Fulton remarking that "Part of the fun of Remain in Memory is that it's engineered well enough that everyone is featured — Rankin, his bandmembers, and even the audience are all captured in a way that's refreshingly authentic." Conoley noted that "Remain in Memory spent quite a bit of time in the mixing and mastering stage, leaving the final product as polished as you'd want a live album to be. The end result is a live album with songs sounding balanced and clean, but with enough of the live spirit and vocal/musical changes remaining to make sure you don't forget you're listening to a live song. The crowd's applause is raised in between songs and where appropriate and their singing along is noticeable, such as on the band’s anthem 'Mother Superior.

Track listing

Personnel 

 Russ Rankin – vocals
 Luke Pabich – guitar
 Chuck Platt – bass guitar
 Sean Sellers – drums
 Cinder Block – female vocals on "A Credit to His Gender"
 Jamie McMann – producer, recording engineer
 Josh Garcia – recording engineer
 Mike Mulet – assistant engineer
 Courtney Eason – assistant engineer
 Andrew Berlin – additional engineering
 Jason Livermore – mix engineer, mastering

References

External links 
 Remain in Memory: The Final Show at Fat Wreck Chords

Good Riddance (band) albums
2008 live albums
Fat Wreck Chords live albums